Sarthebari (IPA:ˌsɑ:θəˈbɑ:rɪ) is a town and a town area committee in Bajali district  in the Indian state of Assam. Sarthebari is home to the bell metal industry, the second largest handicraft of assam after bamboo craft. The nearby villages are Amrikhowa, Pnchag Ram (Lachima, Byaskuchi, Baniyakuchi, Bengapara, Halodhibari, Kamarpara,) Panagaortop, Namsala, Gomura, Karakuchi etc.

Demographics
 India census, Sarthebari had a population of 7545. Males constitute 51% of the population and females 49%. Sarthebari has an average literacy rate of 83%, higher than the national average of 59.5%: male literacy is 88%, and female literacy is 77%. In Sarthebari, 9% of the population is under 6 years of age. Sarthebari is famous for its historic Assamese bellmetal utensils and for traditional Assamese structure called xorai and many people associates with this institute. Sarthebari was declared a town in 1955. Postal code of Sarthebari is 781307.

Education
Sarthebari Higher Secondary School was established in 1940 which is prominent school in the locality. For Girls', there is Sarthebari Girls' High School. For Higher studies Bapuji College is situated there.

References

Cities and towns in Bajali district